Kloster Oesede is a railway station located in Kloster Oesede (Georgsmarienhütte), Germany. The station is on the Osnabrück–Brackwede railway. The train services are operated by NordWestBahn.

Train services
The station is served by the following services:

Local services  Osnabrück - Halle (Westf) - Bielefeld

References

Railway stations in Lower Saxony